

From 9,000 to 9,999 

 9000 Hal
 
 
 
 
 
 
 
 
 
 
 
 
 
 
 
 
 
 
 
 
 
 
 9023 Mnesthus
 
 
 
 
 
 
 
 
 
 
 
 
 
 
 
 
 
 
 
 
 
 
 
 
 9069 Hovland
 
 
 
 
 
 
 
 
 
 
 
 9084 Achristou
 
 
 
 
 
 
 
 
 
 
 
 
 
 
 
 
 
 
 
 
 
 
 
 
 
 9115 Battisti
 
 
 
 
 
 
 
 
 
 
 
 
 
 
 
 
 
 
 
 
 9142 Rhesus
 
 
 
 
 
 
 
 
 
 
 
 
 
 
 
 
 
 
 9165 Raup
 
 
 
 
 
 9175 Graun
 
 
 
 
 
 
 
 
 
 
 
 
 
 
 
 
 
 
 
 
 
 
 
 
 
 
 
 
 
 
 
 9223 Leifandersson
 
 
 
 
 
 
 
 
 
 
 
 
 
 
 
 
 
 
 
 
 
 
 
 
 
 
 
 
 
 
 
 
 9260 Edwardolson
 
 
 
 
 
 
 
 
 
 
 
 
 
 
 
 
 
 
 
 
 
 
 
 
 
 
 
 
 
 
 
 9298 Geake
 
 
 
 
 
 
 
 
 
 
 
 9321 Alexkonopliv
 
 
 
 
 
 
 
 
 
 
 
 
 
 
 9344 Klopstock
 
 
 
 
 
 
 
 
 
 
 
 
 
 
 
 
 
 
 
 
 
 
 
 
 
 
 
 
 
 
 
 
 
 
 
 
 
 
 
 
 
 
 
 
 
 
 
 
 
 
 
 
 
 
 
 9423 Abt
 
 
 
 
 
 
 
 
 
 
 
 
 
 
 
 
 
 
 
 
 
 
 
 
 
 
 
 
 
 
 
 
 
 
 
 
 
 
 
 
 
 
 
 
 
 
 
 
 
 
 
 
 
 
 
 
 
 
 
 
 
 
 
 
 
 
 
 
 
 
 
 
 
 
 
 
 
 
 
 9524 O'Rourke
 
 
 
 
 
 
 
 
 
 
 
 
 
 
 
 
 
 
 
 
 9549 Akplatonov
 
 
 
 
 
 
 
 
 
 
 9564 Jeffwynn
 
 
 
 
 
 
 
 
 
 
 
 
 
 
 
 
 
 
 
 
 
 
 
 
 
 
 
 
 9617 Grahamchapman
 
 
 
 
 
 
 
 
 
 
 
 
 
 
 
 
 
 
 
 9641 Demazière
 
 
 
 
 
 
 
 
 
 
 
 
 
 
 
 
 
 
 
 
 
 
 
 
 
 
 
 
 
 
 
 
 
 
 
 
 
 
 
 
 
 9694 Lycomedes
 
 
 
 
 
 
 
 
 
 
 
 
 
 
 
 
 9712 Nauplius
 
 
 
 
 
 
 
 
 
 
 
 
 
 
 
 
 
 
 
 
 
 
 
 
 
 
 
 
 
 
 
 
 
 
 
 
 9767 Midsomer Norton
 
 
 
 
 
 
 
 
 
 
 
 
 
 
 
 
 
 
 
 
 
 
 9799 Thronium
 
 
 
 
 
 
 
 
 
 
 
 
 
 
 
 
 
 
 
 
 9826 Ehrenfreund
 
 
 
 
 
 
 
 
 
 
 
 
 
 
 9844 Otani
 
 
 
 
 
 
 
 
 
 
 
 
 
 
 
 
 
 
 
 
 
 
 
 
 
 
 
 
 
 
 
 
 
 
 
 
 
 9902 Kirkpatrick
 9903 Leonhardt
 
 9905 Tiziano
 
 
 
 9909 Eschenbach
 9910 Vogelweide
 
 9912 Donizetti
 
 
 
 9916 Kibirev
 
 
 
 
 9921 Rubincam
 
 
 
 
 
 
 
 
 9931 Herbhauptman
 
 
 
 9936 Al-Biruni
 
 
 
 
 
 
 9949 Brontosaurus
 9950 ESA
 9951 Tyrannosaurus
 
 
 
 
 
 9963 Sandage
 
 9965 GNU
 
 9968 Serpe
 9969 Braille
 9971 Ishihara
 
 
 
 
 
 
 9983 Rickfienberg
 
 
 
 
 
 
 9991 Anežka
 
 9994 Grotius
 
 
 
 
 9999 Wiles

See also 
 List of minor planet discoverers
 List of observatory codes

References

External links 
 Discovery Circumstances: Numbered Minor Planets, Minor Planet Center

Lists of minor planets by name